Powerhouse is a gay friendly club and venue in Newcastle upon Tyne.

It has been in four separate locations over its history. Originally a basement club on Waterloo Street in the 1980s. In 2008, the club, now on Westmoreland Road, was leased to Pure Leisure Ltd. It is now under new management by Copenhagen 1801.

The club has four floors, which are not always open at the same time. It also has a roof terrace.

References

 Powerhouse Website: http://www.clubph.co.uk
 https://web.archive.org/web/20101022131532/http://www.thecrackmagazine.com/guide.php?section=3&category=217&loc=ALL
 http://www.chroniclelive.co.uk/north-east-news/news-archive/2004/01/12/scene-set-for-the-gay-community-to-flourish72703-13808761/
 https://web.archive.org/web/20101022131532/http://www.thecrackmagazine.com/guide.php?section=3&category=217&loc=ALL

External links
http://www.clubph.co.uk
http://www.newcastlegay.co.uk

Buildings and structures in Newcastle upon Tyne
Culture in Newcastle upon Tyne